Whitacre Junction railway station  was opened in 1864 by the Midland Railway. It served the village of Whitacre Heath, Warwickshire, England.

History
The line had been opened in 1839 by the Birmingham and Derby Junction Railway from Derby, to a south-facing junction with the London and Birmingham Railway just north of Hampton-in-Arden.

Due to increasing traffic, and the inconvenience of having to reverse trains at Hampton-in-Arden to reach Birmingham Curzon Street, a branch was built in 1842 west from Whitacre to a new Midland Railway passenger station at Birmingham Lawley Street. The station opened to serve this junction.

The Midland Railway generally used the London and North-Western Railway Trent Valley Line and Great Northern Railway tracks to reach London, so the line south to Hampton faded into obscurity. By 1907 the 6½ mile route to Hampton-in-Arden was used by only 1 train per day.

In 1864, the Midland built a new line eastwards to Nuneaton. It is not clear when the original station was built, but it was moved 60 chains further south at this time. 

In 1909 a cutoff line was built between Water Orton and Kingsbury.

The station closed on 4 March 1968.

Stationmasters

John M. Shelly ca. 1850
Charles Broad ca. 1859 - 1872
Joseph Brindley 1872- 1888  (formerly station master at Wichnor Junction, afterwards station master at Widmerpool)
George Lambert 1888 - ca. 1914 (formerly station master at Widmerpool)
H.J. Turner until 1948 (afterwards station master at Selly Oak)
S.W. Jamieson 1956 - 1958 (formerly station master at Peplow, afterwards station master at Lakeside, Windermere)
Mr. Peake from 1958 (formerly station master at Endon, Stoke-on-Trent)

Route

References

External links
 Warwickshire Railways entry

Former Midland Railway stations
Railway stations in Great Britain opened in 1842
Railway stations in Great Britain closed in 1968
Disused railway stations in Warwickshire